Charles Arkoll Boulton (April 17, 1841 – May 15, 1899) is noted for his role in the Red River and North-West Rebellions.

Biography 
He was born in Cobourg, Canada West in 1841, the great-grandson of D'Arcy Boulton, and educated at Upper Canada College. Joining the British Army as an Ensign with the 100th Regiment of Foot, He served at Gibraltar, Malta and Montreal rising to the rank of Captain in 1866. After leaving the British Army in 1868, he became a Major in the Canadian Militia with the 46th East Durham Battalion of Infantry.

In 1869, he was part of a survey party sent to the Red River Colony. On the orders of survey party leader, John Stoughton Dennis, he organized a group of volunteers to try to put down an uprising by Louis Riel. When 50 of his volunteers were captured and imprisoned, he left the colony and went to Portage la Prairie. He met some people who had escaped there and led an attempt to free the remaining captives. They were taken captive by Riel's Métis. He was later released and returned to Ontario.

He operated a sawmill near Lakefield, Ontario, where he became a municipal councillor and then reeve. When his business failed in 1877, he settled in the Shell River valley of Manitoba. He became the first warden of Russell County and chairman of the judicial board for the western district in 1881.

In 1885, he led a group of militia known as Boulton's Scouts to help put down the North-West Rebellion. He was appointed to the Senate of Canada in 1889.

He died in Russell, Manitoba in 1899.

References

External links 
 
Biography at the Dictionary of Canadian Biography Online

1841 births
1899 deaths
Canadian Militia officers
Canadian senators from Manitoba
Canadian surveyors
Conservative Party of Canada (1867–1942) senators
People of the Red River Rebellion
People of the North-West Rebellion
People from Cobourg
Upper Canada College alumni
Pre-Confederation Saskatchewan people